The following is a list of National Register of Historic Places listings in Lenawee County, in the U.S. state of Michigan.

Broken off from the western portion of Monroe County in 1826, Lenawee County was the eighth county formally organized in the Michigan Territory (later the state of Michigan in 1837). With an estimated population at approximately 100,800, Lenawee County is ranked 21st in population of Michigan's 83 counties. Lenawee County currently has 43 listings on the National Register of Historic Places.

The first property listed was Walker Tavern on January 25, 1971. The most recent addition was the Blissfield Downtown Historic District on June 29, 2015. The 43 properties listed include nine historic districts, five churches, 17 houses, one cemetery, and one bridge, among other properties. One property, the Dr. Leonard Hall House in Hudson, has since been demolished but is still listed.  



Current listings

|}

See also

List of Michigan State Historic Sites in Lenawee County, Michigan
List of National Historic Landmarks in Michigan
National Register of Historic Places listings in Michigan
Listings in neighboring counties: Fulton (OH), Hillsdale, Jackson, Lucas (OH), Monroe, Washtenaw

References

Lenawee County